Jafar Abu al-Timman (born 1881-1945) was an Iraqi politician.

Biography
Born in Baghdad, he was the leader of a political group that opposed the British administration of Iraq in 1919–1920. He fled to Iran, then returned to Iraq after Faisal I was proclaimed as King of Iraq. He served as a chairman of the Iraqi National Party in 1922. He served as Minister of Commerce in the second cabinet of Abd Al-Rahman Al-Gillani. He allied with Yasin al-Hashimi, Naji al-Suwaidi, and the National Brotherhood Party in 1930. He supported Bakr Sedqi's military coup in 1936 and served as Minister of Finance in the cabinet of Hikmat Sulayman from 29 October 1936 until he resigned in June 1937. He served as chairman of Baghdad Commerce Chamber from 1935 to 1945.

References

1881 births
Year of death missing
Politicians from Baghdad
Finance ministers of Iraq
Government ministers of Iraq
20th-century Iraqi politicians